(Northern) Burun (Arabic: بورون (?)) is a Nilotic language of Sudan. Blench (2012) lists the three varieties separately.

References

Luo languages